Jesús Alfonso Elizondo Nájera (30 October 1930 – 12 March 2009) was a Mexican sport shooter. He competed at the 1964, 1968, and 1972 Summer Olympics. He was the younger brother of Héctor Elizondo.

References

External links
 

1930 births
2009 deaths
Mexican male sport shooters
Olympic shooters of Mexico
Shooters at the 1964 Summer Olympics
Shooters at the 1968 Summer Olympics
Shooters at the 1972 Summer Olympics
Sportspeople from Mexico City
Pan American Games medalists in shooting
Pan American Games silver medalists for Mexico
Pan American Games bronze medalists for Mexico
Shooters at the 1967 Pan American Games
20th-century Mexican people